George Tomasini (April 20, 1909 – November 22, 1964) was an American film editor, born in Springfield, Massachusetts, who had a decade long collaboration with director Alfred Hitchcock, editing nine of his movies between 1954 and 1964. Tomasini edited many of Hitchcock's best-known works, such as Rear Window (1954), Vertigo (1958), North by Northwest (1959), Psycho (1960), and The Birds (1963), as well as other well-received films such as Cape Fear (1962). On a 2012 listing of the 75 best edited films of all time, compiled by the Motion Picture Editors Guild based on a survey of its members, four films edited by Tomasini for Hitchcock appear. No other editor appeared more than three times on this listing. The listed films were Psycho, Vertigo, Rear Window, and North by Northwest.

George Tomasini was known for his innovative film editing which, together with Hitchcock's stunning techniques, redefined cinematic language. Tomasini's cutting was always stylish and experimental, all the while pursuing the focus of the story and the characters. Hitchcock and Tomasini's editing of Rear Window has been treated at length in Valerie Orpen's monograph, Film Editing: The Art of the Expressive. His dialogue overlapping and use of jump cuts for exclamation points was dynamic and innovative (such as in the scene in The Birds where the car blows up at the gas station and Tippi Hedren's character watches from a window, as well as the infamous "shower scene" in Psycho).  George Tomasini's techniques would influence many subsequent film editors and filmmakers.

George Tomasini was nominated for the Academy Award for Best Film Editing for North by Northwest, but Ben-Hur'''s editors won the award that year.

Tomasini died of a massive heart attack at the age of 55 in California. He left behind Mary Brian, his wife of 17 years and no children.

Filmography as film editor

The director of each film is indicated in parenthesis:
 Wild Harvest (1947 – Garnett)
 The Turning Point (1952 – Dieterle)
 Stalag 17 (1953 – Wilder)
 Houdini (1953 – Marshall)
 Elephant Walk (1954 – Dieterle)
 Rear Window (1954 – Hitchcock)
 To Catch a Thief (1955 – Hitchcock)
 The Man Who Knew Too Much (1956 – Hitchcock)
 The Wrong Man (1956 – Hitchcock)
 Hear Me Good (1957 - McGuire)
 Vertigo (1958 – Hitchcock)
 I Married a Monster from Outer Space (1958 - Fowler)
 North by Northwest (1959 – Hitchcock)
 The Time Machine (1960 – Pal)
 Psycho (1960 – Hitchcock)
 The Misfits (1961 – Huston)
 Cape Fear (1962 – Thompson)
 The Birds (1963 – Hitchcock)
 Who's Been Sleeping in My Bed? (1963 – Mann)
 Marnie (1964 – Hitchcock)
 7 Faces of Dr. Lao (1964 – Pal)
 In Harm's Way (1965 – Preminger)

See also

List of film director and editor collaborations

References

Further reading
 This interview with Tomasini's wife appears to be unique as a source of biographical information about Tomasini.
 Bobbie O'Steen provides a frame-by-frame analysis of an important scene from Rear Window''.

External links
 
 

1909 births
1964 deaths
People from Springfield, Massachusetts
Burials at Forest Lawn Memorial Park (Hollywood Hills)
American film editors